Vesterport Station is a S-train station in the centre of Copenhagen, Denmark. The station is located in the district of Indre By, and is named after the historic Vesterport city gate, although it is located quite a distance from the original location of the city gate. It opened in 1934. The station is situated below ground level on the Boulevard Line, just before the tunnel connecting Copenhagen Central Station and Østerport Station.

History
Vesterport Station opened on 15 May 1934 as S-train service on the Boulevard Line commenced.

Layout 
The station is situated below ground level on the Boulevard Line, just before the tunnel connecting Copenhagen Central Station and Østerport Station. The station is located below street level, but is not under ground. Main line trains don't stop here, only S-trains.

Operations 
All S-train services except the F-line stop at the station.

Gallery

See also

 Transportation in Denmark
 Transportation in Copenhagen
 Rail transport in Denmark
 History of rail transport in Denmark
 List of DSB railway stations
 Danish State Railways
 Banedanmark

References

Citations

Bibliography

External links

  Vesterport Station at dsb.dk
  Banedanmark – government agency responsible for maintenance and traffic control on most of the Danish railway network
  DSB – largest Danish train operating company
  Danske Jernbaner – website with information on railway history in Denmark

S-train (Copenhagen) stations
Railway stations opened in 1934
1934 establishments in Denmark
Knud Tanggaard Seest railway stations
Railway stations in Denmark opened in the 20th century